Owain son of Maredudd (died c. 810) was a king of Dyfed who ruled briefly at the beginning of the 9th century between his brother Rhain and his nephew Triffyn. His death was noted by the undated Annals of Wales. Phillimore's reconstruction places the entry at AD 810.

His father was Maredudd ap Tewdws.

The genealogies of subsequent kings of Dyfed sometimes include Tangwystl, a daughter of Owain's whose marriage justified the rule of their own dynasty. However, her actual existence is uncertain.

References

810 deaths
Monarchs of Dyfed
9th-century Welsh monarchs
Year of birth unknown